The 2004–05 UCLA Bruins men's basketball team represented the University of California, Los Angeles in the 2004–05 NCAA Division I men's basketball season.  UCLA entered the Pacific-10 conference tournament with a regular season conference record of 11–7.  After losing in the first round, their final conference record was 11–8 (7 wins more than the previous season).  The team reached the round of 64 in the NCAA tournament, losing to the Texas Tech Red Raiders.

Roster

Schedule

|-
!colspan=9 style=|Exhibition

|-
!colspan=9 style=|Regular Season

|-
!colspan=9 style=| Pac-10 Tournament

|-
!colspan=9 style=| NCAA tournament

Source

References

UCLA
UCLA Bruins men's basketball seasons
NCAA
NCAA
Ucla